Villeneuve-Saint-Georges is a commune in the southeastern suburbs of Paris, France. People from Villeneuve-Saint-Georges are called Villeneuvois in French.

History

Prehistory and Antiquity
Villeneuve-Saint-Georges was settled during the Paleolithic and the Neolithic ages at the meeting of the Yerres and the Seine rivers, as well at Triage, with evidence from archeological remains found by Francis Martin in the 19th century, which includes flints and some stone tools.

After the battle of Melun during the Roman Empire, the area was integrated into the Roman Empire. A small town was built around the area, with the name of Villa Nova (Latin for new house).

Middle Ages
In the Middle Ages, Villeneuve-Saint-Georges was a possession of the abbey of Saint-Germain-des-Prés. The addition of "Saint-Georges" in the name of the commune was after the remains of Saint George was brought back in AD 858. The strategic position on the road between Paris towards the cities of Melun, Clermont-Ferrand and Lyon made it a transport hub and wan regularly visited and traversed by kings and dukes. The importance of the towns led it to be plundered, raided and besieged many times, including during the Hundred Years' War.

The city mostly relied on farming and wine-making for income.

Renaissance and Modern Times
During the Siege of Paris in 1590, Captain Saint-Paul forced his way into Villeneuve-Saint-Georges and killed the 200-300 men under the name of Henry IV of France who were garrisoned there, whilst delivering food and assistance to the besieged people in Paris.

During the modern times, Villeneuve became a bourgeois city. Mansions, like the castles of Beauregard and Bellevue were built in the area, and people of the higher classes visited Villeneuve, like Henry IV of France, Catherine de' Medici and Mme of Sévigné.

In 1652, The Prince of Condé rebelled, and Charles IV sent Turenne to confront him. A battle took place between them in the area.

Revolution and the 19th Century
During the Revolution, the national guard was created and the church was looted. Shortly after that Villeneuve became a quiet town again. Many people came to live in Villeneuve, including composers (Boieldieu), painters (Francesco Casanova, Karl Joseph Kuwasseg) naturalists (Charles Athanase Walckenaer), ministers (Victor Duruy), ceramists (Jean-Paul Louis Chesnel-Larossière), and ambassadors (Louis-Jules Mancini-Mazarini). Many personalities, such as Napoleon, Joachim Murat and Prince Eugène, also stopped in Villeneuve. In 1876, Fort Villeneuve was built to protect Paris in anticipation of a future war. The establishment of the railway in 1847 transformed the city, with the agricultural village very quickly became a working-class town.

20th Century

On the eve of the First World War, Villeneuve-Saint-Georges had more than 10,000 inhabitants. It was the first railway town in the country with the largest sorting in Europe. The Foyer and HBM sets were built at this time.

On July 30, 1908, following the calls for a 24-hour general strike launched by the General Confederation of Labour to demand a 10-hour day, weekly rest, a salary increase and the end of Piece work, thousands of demonstrators gathered in Vigneux-sur-Seine and Draveil, then converged in the town where a violent confrontation took place between the National Gendarmerie and the workers. The result fight left four dead and more than 200 injured among the workers, and 69 injured on the side of the forces of order. A local odonym (“Place du 30-Juillet-1908”) recalls these events. The next day, Georges Clemenceau ordered the arrest of thirty leaders of the CGT, including its general secretary Victor Griffuelhes, to neutralize the union.

A painting by Théodore Rousseau, titled La Seine à Villeneuve-Saint-Georges, which was in the Palais des Beaux-Arts in Lille was destroyed in 1916.

During the First World War, Villeneuve-Saint-Georges hosted the 232nd Territorial Infantry Regiment (normally quartered in Argentan). The school hospital becomes the Auxiliary Hospital of the Military Wounded Relief Society (HASSBM) No.42, while the Ferry School Group becomes the Auxiliary Hospital of the Ladies of France Association (HAADF) No.248.

After the introduction of paid leave, at the time of the great departures on vacation, a derailment on July 30, 1937 left twenty-nine dead and one hundred and eleven injured at the junction between the Brunoy and Corbeil lines.

During the Second World War, the city was bombarded by Allied aircraft because the Wehrmacht used the railway installations. Many Resistance fighters are also killed after the “Triage sabotage”. After these events, a new demographic surge saw the construction of large housing estates in the North part of Villeneuve.

On January 1, 1968, Villeneuve-Saint-Georges, which until then had been part of the department of Seine-et-Oise, became one of the municipalities of the new Val-de-Marne.

21st Century
The town, compared to the rest of Val-de-Marne, is perceived as noisy and undesirable place to go. It has lost its charm during the 18th and 19th centuries, and starting from 1980 workers have deserted the city, leaving a mostly immigrant population, most from the Maghreb. A final destination for most of these immigrants, the gathering of these communities have made it unappealing to local French.

The Route Nationale 6 cuts through the commune and runs parallel to the RER line, producing much noise. The N6 is also famous for having long traffic jams at the junction between the N6, N406 and the A86 Ring road.

Transport
Villeneuve-Saint-Georges is served by two stations on Paris RER line D: Villeneuve-Triage and Villeneuve-Saint-Georges. It is also the site of the  Villeneuve-Saint-Georges marshalling yard.

Demography

Education
The commune is served by multiple primary schools.

Secondary schools:
 Three junior high schools: Collège Pierre-Brossolette, Collège Jules-Ferry, Collège Roland-Garros 
 One senior high school: Lycée François Arago

Twin towns – sister cities

Villeneuve-Saint-Georges is twinned with:
 Eastleigh, England, United Kingdom
 Kornwestheim, Germany

Notable people
Jérémy Cordoval, footballer
Jacques Faty, footballer
Ricardo Faty, French-Senegalese footballer
Yoan Gouffran, footballer
Maxence Lacroix, footballer
Geoffrey Lembet, French-Central African footballer
Gérard Pussey, writer
Therry Racon, footballer
MC Solaar, hip hop and rap artist
Mickaël Tavares, French-Senegalese footballer
Patrick Pelloux, emergency physician
Cécile Duflot, member of French National Assembly for Paris and Minister of Housing in 2012–2014
Niska, hip hop and rap artist

See also
Communes of the Val-de-Marne department

References

External links

Official website (in French)

Communes of Val-de-Marne
Val-de-Marne communes articles needing translation from French Wikipedia